Georg Selenius (born 18 October 1884; died 7 May 1924 in Fredrikstad) was a Norwegian gymnast who competed in the 1912 Summer Olympics. He was part of the Norwegian team, which won the gold medal in the gymnastics men's team, free system event.

References

External links
profile

1884 births
1924 deaths
Norwegian male artistic gymnasts
Gymnasts at the 1912 Summer Olympics
Olympic gymnasts of Norway
Olympic gold medalists for Norway
Olympic medalists in gymnastics
Medalists at the 1912 Summer Olympics
20th-century Norwegian people